Island Grove is an unincorporated community in Alachua County, Florida, United States. Its ZIP code is 32654.

Island Grove can be found near the southeastern terminus of County Road 325 and US 301. The CSX Wildwood Subdivision also passes through the community.

Residents of Island Grove are zoned for their children to attend Chester Shell Elementary School and Hawthorne JR/SR High, both in Hawthorne, Florida.

Island Grove is the part of Florida immortalized in the writings of Marjorie Kinnan Rawlings, who lived just up the road at Cross Creek.

See also
Island Grove Masonic Lodge No. 125

References

Unincorporated communities in Alachua County, Florida
Populated places established in 1882
1882 establishments in Florida
Unincorporated communities in Florida